Luisa of Naples and Sicily (Luisa Maria Amalia Teresa; 27 July 1773 – 19 September 1802) was Grand Duchess of Tuscany as the wife of Ferdinand III, Grand Duke of Tuscany. She was born a princess of Naples and Sicily as a daughter born to Ferdinand I of the Two Sicilies and Maria Carolina of Austria. 

Luisa had a rough correspondence with preeminent painter Élisabeth Vigée Le Brun—who was commissioned to paint portraits of Luisa and her elder siblings. Vigée Le Brun dubbed Luisa as the “most ugly” daughter of Ferdinand and Maria Carolina, and was even reluctant to finish her portrait. In matter of fact, many disliked Luisa’s appearance, and found her to be unattractive. Despite this, Luisa was known to be kindhearted to those around her.

After eleven years of marriage, Luisa and her husband, Ferdinand, were unwillingly forced into exile upon the Treaty of Aranjuez in 1801. The couple soon fled to Vienna, Austria, where they would stay for nearly a year until Ferdinand compensated with the Electorate of Salzburg, giving him titles and land. Luisa, however, died aged 29, before her husband re-ascended the throne.

Life

Childhood (1773–1790) 
Luisa Maria Amalia Teresa was born on 27 July 1773, at the Royal Palace of Naples. Her parents were Ferdinand I of the Two Sicilies and his wife, Maria Carolina of Austria. Luisa was one of eighteen children, seven of whom survived into adulthood. She was often called Maria Luisa.

Her paternal grandparents were Charles III of Spain and Maria Amalia of Saxony; her maternal grandparents were Francis I, Holy Roman Emperor and Maria Theresa of Austria.

Marriage (1790–1802)
On 15 August 1790, Maria Luisa was wed with her first cousin Ferdinand, Grand Duke of Tuscany. The wedding ceremony took place in Florence. Her husband ruled the Grand Duchy of Tuscany until 1790, but was forced into exile due to the Treaty of Aranjuez, in which he was to, by Napoleon, make way for the Kingdom of Etruria.

The couple both went into exile and lived in Vienna, the capital of the Austrian Empire, which was ruled by Archduke Ferdinand's elder brother, Emperor Francis II. Soon, Ferdinand was compensated by being given the secularized lands of the Archbishop of Salzburg as Grand-Duke of Salzburg.

Correspondence with Élisabeth Vigée Le Brun
In 1790 prominent French painter Élisabeth Vigée Le Brun was commissioned to paint portraits of Maria Carolina’s four eldest children—one of them being Maria Luisa. Though, whilst painting Luisa, Le Brun was reluctant to finish it due to Luisa’s features. Le Brun detailed the encounter in her memoirs, recalling: 
Despite the criticism given to her, Luisa remained charitable, and kind to those critical of her appearance.

Death
On 19 September 1802, upon a somewhat complicated childbirth, Maria Luisa died giving birth to a stillborn son at the Hofburg, in Vienna. She is currently buried in the Imperial Crypt, in Austria, with her stillborn son in her arms.

Aftermath 
Her husband outlived her by 23 years, he himself dying in 1824. Before his death, however, he had his Tuscan title reassumed—in 1814—after the title was held by Elisa Bonaparte. Ferdinand also remarried in 1821 to Princess Maria Ferdinanda of Saxony, though this marriage remained childless.

Children
 Archduchess Carolina Ferdinanda Teresa (2 August 1793 – 5 January 1802); died in childhood.
 Archduke Francesco Leopoldo (15 December 1794 – 18 May 1800); died in childhood.
 Leopold II, Grand Duke of Tuscany (3 October 1797 – 29 January 1870); became Grand Duke of Tuscany, marrying Maria Anna of Saxony and Princess Maria Antonia of the Two Sicilies. Had issue.
 Archduchess Maria Luisa Giuseppa (30 August 1799 – 15 June 1857); was born disabled and suffered a severe deformity. Due to this, she was affectionately called "the little hunchback" by the people of Florence. Never married, nor had issue.
 Archduchess Maria Theresa (21 March 1801 – 12 January 1855); became queen of Sardinia upon marriage to Charles Albert. Had issue.
 Stillborn son* (19 September 1802)

Ancestry

References

External links

 Luisa Maria Amalia Teresa, Princess of Naples and Sicily at the British Museum

1773 births
1802 deaths
Austrian princesses
Deaths in childbirth
Grand Duchesses of Tuscany
House of Bourbon-Two Sicilies
House of Habsburg-Lorraine
Italian Roman Catholics
Neapolitan princesses
18th-century Neapolitan people
Sicilian princesses
19th-century Neapolitan people
Burials at the Imperial Crypt
Burials at St. Stephen's Cathedral, Vienna
Daughters of kings